Su Tseng-chang was appointed to the premiership on 14 January 2019 by President Tsai Ing-wen. He succeeded William Lai, who had resigned in response to the Democratic Progressive Party's poor performance in the 2018 Taiwanese local elections. This is his second tenure of premiership, as he had served as premier under President Chen Shui-bian from 2006 to 2007 with Tsai Ing-wen, the current president, as his deputy. At the age of 71, he is the third oldest individual (after Lee Huan and Chen Chien-jen) to assume the office.

Su's premiership has led to an increase in approval of the Tsai administration. Recent polls showed an 8.5 percentage point increase in approval of the Tsai administration, with an approval rating of 43 percent. As premier, Su has an approval rating of 53 percent.

Members

Leaders

Ministries

Councils and Commissions 
Empowered by various laws, or even the Constitution, under the Executive Yuan Council several individual boards are formed to enforce different executive functions of the government. Unless regulated otherwise, the chairs are appointed by and answer to the Premier. The committee members of the boards are usually (a) governmental officials for the purpose of interdepartmental coordination and cooperation; or (b) creditable professionals for their reputation and independence.

Independent Commissions 
There are, or would be, independent executive commissions under the Executive Yuan Council. The chiefs of these five institutions would not be affected by any change of the Premier. However, the related organic laws are currently under revision.

Other organs

References

Executive Yuan